L class or Class L may refer to:

Locomotives
 Barry Railway Class L, 0-6-4T steam tank locomotives
 Highland Railway L Class, 4-4-0 steam locomotives 
 Maine Central class L 4-4-0, steam locomotives 
 NBR Class L,  4-4-2T  steam locomotives
 NZR L class, 2-4-0T steam locomotives
 LB&SCR L class, 4-6-4 steam tank locomotives 
 Victorian Railways L class, electric locomotives
 WAGR L class, light axle load steam locomotives
 WAGR L class (diesel)

Ship types
 L-class destroyer (disambiguation), several classes
 L-class submarine (disambiguation), several classes

Other uses
 L-class blimp, airships built for the U.S. Navy
 Sydney L-Class Tram
 L-class star, a type of brown dwarves
 L (complexity), a complexity class in computational complexity theory
 L class, indicates "Miscellaneous" when used in the fifth letter notation on the NYSE ticker symbol.

See also

 
 
 
 
 Class 1 (disambiguation)
 Class I (disambiguation)
 I class (disambiguation)
 L (disambiguation)
 L type (disambiguation) or Type-L